Otumfuo-Yere Julia Osei Tutu (born on 14 December Julia Ama Adwapa Amaning) is wife of Asantehene, Otumfuo Nana Osei Tutu II.

Early life

Lady Julia Osei Tutu, wife of Otumfuo Osei Tutu II Asantehene, was born as Julia Ama Adwapa Amaning, the last of five children born to Mr. S. A. Amaning, a retired career diplomat and Mrs. E. A. Amaning. 

A daughter of Akyem Abuakwa in the Eastern Region, Lady Julia and Otumfuo Nana Osei Tutu II married in April 2002 and have 6 children together. She is of the House of Oyoko Dynasty (by marriage).

Education 

Lady Julia received her primary education at schools in London, Accra and in Berne, Switzerland until 1982, after which she entered Wesley Girls’ High School in Cape Coast for her Secondary School education, where she obtained her ‘O’ Level Certificate in 1986 and ‘A’ Level Certificate in 1988.

In 1989, Lady Julia entered the Faculty of Law at the University of Ghana, Legon and obtained a Bachelor of Law Degree with honours, LL.B. (Hons.) in 1992. She continued her law studies at the Ghana School of Law, Accra where she completed the Professional Law Course and was called to the Ghana Bar in 1994.

On completion of the Professional Law Course, she served as a Teaching Assistant in International Law at the Faculty of Law of the University of Ghana for a year and also undertook private practice at the Law Offices of Agyemang and Associates, a law firm in Accra.

In September 1995, Lady Julia Osei Tutu was admitted for post graduate studies at Queen's University, Kingston, Ontario, Canada and obtained a Master of Laws (LL.M) in International Humanitarian Law after which she served as an Intern with Amnesty International's United Nations Office in New York.

Work 
In 1998, she returned to Ghana and joined Ecobank Ghana Limited as Legal/Corporate Affairs Officer. She was also, until March 2002, secretary to the National Partnership for Children's Trust, which Trust is concerned with the promotion of the welfare of children in Ghana. She is also a patron of the Otumfuo Charity Foundation.

Lady Julia speaks Twi, English and French.

References

Date of birth missing (living people)
Living people
Ashanti royalty
Year of birth missing (living people)
University of Ghana alumni
People educated at Wesley Girls' Senior High School
Ghana School of Law alumni